Airoli Assembly constituency is one of the 288 Vidhan Sabha (Legislative Assembly) constituencies of Maharashtra state in western India.

Overview
Airoli constituency is one of the 18 Vidhan Sabha constituencies located in Thane district, in Navi Mumbai area.

Airoli is part of the Thane Lok Sabha constituency along with five other Vidhan Sabha segments, namely, Mira Bhayandar, Kopri-Pachpakhadi, Thane, Ovala-Majiwada and Belapur in Thane district.

Members of Vidhan Sabha

Election results

2019 result

2014 result

2009 result

See also
 Airoli
 List of constituencies of Maharashtra Vidhan Sabha

References

Assembly constituencies of Thane district
Assembly constituencies of Maharashtra